Zuzana Licko (born Zuzana Ličko, 1961) is a Slovak-born American type designer and visual artist known for co-founding Emigre Fonts, a digital type foundry in Berkeley, CA. She has designed and produced numerous digital typefaces including the popular Mrs Eaves, Modula, Filosofia, and Matrix. As a corresponding interest she also creates ceramic sculptures, textile prints and jacquard weavings.

Early life
Licko was born in Bratislava, Czechoslovakia and came to the United States with her family as a child. She studied architecture, photography, and computer programming before earning a degree in graphic communications at the University of California at Berkeley.

Licko was introduced to computers by her father, a biomathematician at the University of California, San Francisco. She would help him with data processing during her summer breaks. The first font she created on a computer was a Greek alphabet, adapted for the pen plotter, which her father used on his graph printouts.

When she started her university education, her goal was to earn a degree in architecture, but she changed to a visual studies major when she discovered her passion after taking graphic design and typography classes. While at Berkeley, Licko took a calligraphy class, but struggled with it, because she was forced to write with her right hand even though she is left-handed. This experience influenced her rejection of many traditional type design practices as she started exploring the capabilities of the Macintosh computer.

In an interview featured in Eye, Licko described her creative relationship with her husband Rudy VanderLans:

Emigre
In 1985, Licko and VanderLans started Emigre Graphics which had grown out of Emigre magazine, a publication co-founded by VanderLans and two Dutch friends the previous year. VanderLans also started incorporating the bitmap typefaces that Licko designed on the Apple Macintosh in his layouts with issue # 2. Licko's experimental type designs became a prominent feature of the magazine for its entire run. Licko began selling commercial licenses of its digital fonts to users worldwide, first under the name Emigre Graphics and later as Emigre Fonts.

Emigre magazine prominently featured Licko's fonts, some of which were initially created for use in the publication. The magazine is an unintentional archive of Licko's work and progression as a type designer. From her pixelated fonts optimized for bitmap printing to her sophisticated vector designs, Licko's technique advanced with technology. In Emigre: Graphic Design into the Digital Realm, Licko discusses her necessary departure from classic type forms in her early fonts. I started my venture with bitmap type designs, created for the coarse resolutions of the computer screen and dot matrix printer. The challenge was that because the early computers were so limited in what they could do you really had to design something special. Even if it was difficult to adapt calligraphy to lead and later lead to photo technology, it could be done, but it was physically impossible to adapt 8-point Goudy Old Style to 72 dots to the inch. In the end you couldn't tell Goudy Old Style from Times Roman or any other serif text face.Licko has designed at least three dozen font families. In the mid-1990s, she worked on two notable revivals: Mrs Eaves (based on Baskerville) and Filosofia (based on Bodoni). Updating these historical models for use both in print and on-screen, Licko included extensive ligatures with each typeface.

Emigre is not just for fonts. In recent years, Licko has turned her attention to creating ceramics and textiles under the same moniker. In an 2017 interview with Zuzana Kvetkova, Licko shares about her love of ceramics and her process:I’ve always enjoyed creating ceramic objects, and I need this to balance out the ephemeral nature of digital work. I find that my current work on modular ceramic sculptures and fabric prints is actually an extension of type design. I’m using font software to create sketches for my ceramic sculptures, which exist of repeating elements. Each sculpture has a variety of shapes that can be combined to make different sculptures. The font software helps me go through the possible variations. The elements for the textile designs are also created as fonts, which I configure into various patterns. Perhaps my focusing on a physical medium is a reaction against everything being consumed digitally these days.

Fonts designed by Licko

Bitmaps: Emperor, Universal, Oakland and Emigre, 1985, re-released as Lo-Res, 2001
Modula, 1985
Citizen, 1986
Matrix, 1986, re-released as Matrix II, 2007
Variex, 1988 (collaboration with Rudy VanderLans)
Oblong, 1988 (collaboration with Rudy VanderLans)
Senator, 1988
Lunatix, 1988
Elektrix, 1989
Triplex, 1989 Condensed added in 1991
Totally Gothic, 1990
Journal, 1990
Whirligig, 1994
Dogma, 1994
Modula Round, Outlined & Ribbed, 1995
Soda Script, 1995
Base Nine and Twelve, 1995
Mrs Eaves, 1996
Filosofia and Filosofia Grand, 1996
Base Monospace, 1997
Hypnopaedia, 1997
Tarzana, 1998
Solex, 2000
Fairplex, 2002
Puzzler, 2005
Mrs Eaves XL Serif, 2009
Mr Eaves Sans, 2009
Mr Eaves XL Sans, 2009
Base 900, 2010
Program, 2013
Tangly, 2018
Crackly, 2019

Essays by Licko
 Ambition/Fear, Emigre 11, with Rudy VanderLans, 1989. 
 Discovery by Design, Emigre 32, edited by Rudy VanderLans, 1994. 
 Ceramics and Type Design: Differently Similar, online at the Emigre website.
 Emigre: Graphic Design into the Digital Realm.

Awards
Licko and her husband Rudy VanderLans won the Chrysler Design Award in 1994. Apart from winning this award, their work on Emigre also won the Publish magazine Impact Award in 1996. A year later, they got an American Institute for Graphic Arts Gold Medal Award. Soon after, in 1998 they were awarded the Charles Nyples Award in Innovation in Typography.

The Society of Typographic Aficionados awarded Licko the 2013 SOTA Typography Award, citing her "intellectual, highly-structured approach to type design" and her contributions to the digital typography industry.
 MacUser Desktop Publisher of the Year Award, 1986
 Chrysler Award for Innovation in Design, 1994
 Publish Magazine Impact Awards, 1996
 American Institute of Graphic Arts Gold Medal Award, 1997
 Charles Nypels Award for Excellence in Typography, 1998
 Honorary members of the Society of Typographic Arts, Chicago, 2010
 Society of Typographic Aficionados Annual Typography Award, 2013
 29th New York Type Directors Club Medal, 2016

Museum exhibits
Solo exhibitions
 “Emigre Magazine: Selections from the Permanent Collection,” Museum of Modern Art, San Francisco, 1997
 “Charles Nypels Prize,” Jan van Eyck Academy, Maastricht, Netherlands, 1998
 “Emigre in Istanbul,” Contemporary Art Center, Istanbul, Turkey, 1999
 “Emigre in Norfolk,” Old Dominion University Gallery, Norfolk, Virginia, 2005
 “Emigre at Gallery 16,” Gallery 16, San Francisco, 2010
 “Emigre magazine: design, discourse and authorship,” University of Reading, UK, 2017

General exhibitions
 “Pacific Wave: California Graphic Design,” Museo Fortuny, Venice, Italy, 1987
 “Graphic Design in America,” Walker Art Center, Minneapolis, 1989
 “Mixing Messages: Graphic Design in Contemporary Culture,” Cooper-Hewitt National Design Museum, 1996
 “Designer as Author, Voices and Visions,” Northern Kentucky University, 1996
 “Design Culture Now: National Design Triennial,” Cooper-Hewitt National Design Museum, 2000
 “East Coast/West Coast” at Centre du Graphisme, Echirolles, France, 2002
 "D-Day:le design aujourd'hui," at Centre Pompidou, Paris, 2005
 “Digitally Mastered,” MoMA, New York, 2007
 “Quick, Quick, Slow,” Experimentadesign Lisboa 2009, Berardo Collection Museum, Lisbon, Portugal, 2009 (featured Emigre magazine issues10–24)
 “Typographic Tables,” Museum of Modern and Contemporary Art, Bolzano, Italy, 2011
 “Deep Surface: Contemporary Ornament and Pattern,” Contemporary Art Museum, Raleigh, 2011
 “Graphic Design: Now in Production,” Walker Art Center, Minneapolis, 2011 (featured "Emigre No. 70: The Look Back Issue" and Base 900)
 “Postmodernism: Style and Subversion 1970–1990,” Victoria & Albert Museum, London, 2011
 "Standard Deviations," MoMA, New York, 2011 (featured 23 digital typefaces for their permanent collection, including five Emigre font families: Jeffery Keedy's Keedy Sans, Jonathan Barnbrook's Mason Serif, Barry Deck's Template Gothic, Zuzana Licko's Oakland—renamed Lo-Res in 2001—and P. Scott Makela's Dead History)
 “Work from California,” 25th International Biennial of Graphic Design, Brno, Czech Republic, 2012
 “Revolution/Evolution,” College for Creative Studies, Detroit, 2014
 “Typeface to Interface,” Museum of Modern Art, San Francisco, 2016
 “California Graphic Design, 1975–95,” Los Angeles County Museum of Art, Los Angeles, 2018
 “Between the Lines: Typography in LACMA’s Collection,” Los Angeles County Museum of Art, Los Angeles, 2019

Permanent collections
 Denver Art Museum holds a complete set of Emigre magazine in their permanent collection.
 Design Museum in London holds a complete set of Emigre magazine in their permanent collection.
 Letterform Archive holds the Emigre Archives in their permanent collection.
 Museum für Gestaltung (Museum of Design, Zurich) holds Emigre magazine issues in their permanent collection.
 Museum of Modern Art in New York holds a complete set of Emigre magazine, and five digital fonts from the Emigre Fonts library in their permanent collection.
 Museum of Modern Art in San Francisco holds a complete set of Emigre magazine in their permanent collection.

See also
 List of AIGA medalists
 Filosofia
Mrs Eaves

Notes

Additional online resources
Eye (Website), “Cult of the Ugly,” by Steven Heller, 1993
 Letter to Emigre Magazine, (PDF) by Gunnar Swanson, 1994
 2x4 (Website), “Designer as Author,” by Michael Rock, 1996
Graphic Design USA 18. "Critical Conditions: Zuzana Licko, Rudy VanderLans, and the Emigre Spirit" by Michael Dooley, 1998.
 SpeakUp (Website), Interview with Rudy VanderLans by Armin Vit, 2002. 
 Typotheque (Website), “Context in Critique,” review of Emigre #64, Rant, by Dmitri Siegel, 2004
 Typotheque (Website), “Rudy VanderLans, editor of Emigre,” interview by David Casacuberta and Rosa Llop, 2004
 AIGA (Website), “An Interview with Rudy VanderLans: Still Subversive After All These Years,” by Steven Heller, 2004
 Design Observer (Website), “Emigre: An Ending,” by Rick Poynor, 2005
 TapeOp (Website), “Rudy VanderLans: Emigre No. 69: The End,” review by John Baccigaluppi, 2008
 Eye (Website), “The farewell tour syndrome,” book review by Emily King, 2009
 Communication Arts (Website), “Emigre No.70: The Look Back Issue,” book review by Angelynn Grant, 2009
 Dwell (Website), "Emigre No.70,” book review by Miyoko Ohtake, 2009
 Print (Website), “Emigre’s Lucky Number,” by Steven Heller, 2009
 Print magazine (Website), “Design Couples: Rudy VanderLans and Zuzana Licko," interview by Caitlin Dover, 2010
Étapes magazine (Website) Zuzana Licko interview with Pascal Béjean, 2010
 Fast Company (Website), “Type Master: An Interview with Emigre’s Rudy VanderLans," by Alissa Walker, 2010. 
MoMA (Website), Emigre Magazine, issues 1-69, permanent collection, 2011 
 MoMA (Website), Oakland typeface, permanent collection, 2011
 The Atlantic (Website), "Can the Rule-Breaking Font Designers of Three Decades Ago Still Break Rules?,” by Steven Heller, 2012
Plazm Magazine (Website), "In Conversation with Emigre" by Sara Dougher and Joshua Berger, 2013
100 Best Fonts, 2015
 Print (Website), “The Legibility Wars of the ‘80s and ‘90s,” 2016
 Communication Arts (Website), “Emigre Fonts,” book review by Angelynn Grant, 2016
 AIGA, Eye on Design (Website), “Emigre Type Foundry Pretty Much Designed the ‘90s—Here’s What it Looked Like,” book review by Angela Riechers, 2016
 MyFonts (Website), interview with Zuzana Licko by Jan Middendorp, 2016. 
 Fontstand (Website), “Emigre: Time and Time Again,” by Sébastien Morlighem, 2016
 Klim Type Foundry (Website), “Tilting at windmills,” Rudy vanderLans replies to “Welcome to the infill font foundry,” 2016
 Huffington Post (Website), “One of Today’s Most Popular Fonts Has a Wild Centuries-Long History,” by Maddie Crum, 2017
University of Reading (Website), “Emigre magazine: design, discourse and authorship,” an exhibition curated by Francisca Monteiro and Rick Poynor, 2017
 Typography & Graphic Communication (Website), "Emigre magazine: design, discourse and authorship,” exhibition, 2017
 ReadyMag Stories (Website), “Emigre,” by Zhdan Philippov and Vitaly Volk, 2020
 “Typography and Legibility: An Analysis of Tschichold, Licko, and VanderLans,” (PDF) by Chaney Boyle, 2020

Additional print resources
Additional print resources
Bouvet, Michel, East Coast West Coast: Graphistes aux États-unis, Paris, France, Les Éditions Textuel, 2002. Essay on history of Emigre.
Cees W. De Jong, Alston W. Purvis, and Friedrich Friedl. 2005. Creative Type: A Sourcebook of Classical and Contemporary Letterforms. Thames & Hudson.
Dawson, Peter, The Field Guide to Typography: Typefaces in the Urban Landscape, New York, NY, Prestel, 2013. Interview with Rudy VanderLans & Zuzana Licko.
Eskilson, Stephen J., Graphic Design: A New History, London, UK, Laurence King Publishing, 2007. Essay on Emigre in chapter on “Postmodern Typography.”

Heller, Stephen, ed., Design Literacy: Understanding Graphic Design. New York, NY, Allworth Press with School of Visual Arts, 2014. Essay on Emigre in chapter on "Mass Media.”
Lupton, Ellen, Mixing Messages: Graphic Design in Contemporary Culture, New York, NY, Princeton Architectural Press, 1996. Short profile of Emigre and Zuzana Licko's typefaces. Book published in conjunction with exhibit at Cooper-Hewitt National Design Museum.
McCarthy, Steven, The Designer as Author, Producer, Activist, Entrepreneur, Curator & Collaborator: New Models for Communicating, Amsterdam, Netherlands, BIS, 2013. Emigre referenced throughout, and short profile of Emigre in chapter on “Typographic Design Authorship.”
Meggs, Philip B., ed., A History of Graphic Design, New York, NY, John Wiley & Sons, 1998. Profile of Emigre in chapter on “Pioneers of Digital Graphic Design.”
Poynor, Rick, Design Without Boundaries: Visual Communication in Transition, London, UK, Booth-Clibborn Editions, 1998. Emigre referenced in essay “Cult of the Ugly,” and one essay, “Into the Digital Realm,” on Emigre.
Poynor, Rick, No More Rules: Graphic Design and Postmodernism, New Haven, CT, Yale University Press, 2003. Emigre referenced throughout.
Shaughnessy, Adrian, How to be a Graphic Designer, Without Losing Your Soul, London, UK, Laurence King Publishing, 2005. Interview with Rudy VanderLans.

External links
 Emigre official site
Emigre Archives at Letterform Archive
Emigre Magazine Index created by Jessica Barness for The Goldstein Museum of Design
Emigre Fonts at Adobe Fonts
Zuzana Licko

1961 births
AIGA medalists
Living people
Slovak emigrants to the United States
University of California, Berkeley alumni
Women graphic designers
American graphic designers